Sybrandus Johannes Andreas Dijkstra (born 20 October 1966) is a Dutch football coach and former professional footballer, who is goalkeeping coach at Fortuna Sittard.

As a player, he was a goalkeeper who notably played in the Premier League for Queens Park Rangers and in the Scottish Premiership for Motherwell and Dundee United. He also played in the Football League for Bristol City and Wycombe Wanderers, as well as in his home country for Roda JC, AZ Alkmaar, VV Sittard and RBC. He also had spells in Belgium and Germany with KSC Hasselt and Germania Teveren.

Playing career
Dijkstra began his career with Roda JC but failed to make an appearance, spending time on loan at AZ and Hasselt.

In 1991, he moved to Scottish side Motherwell, where he made his debut in an August 1991 League Cup tie against Raith Rovers. He would spend the next three seasons at Fir Park, replacing Ally Maxwell in the squad and eventually winning a battle for the starting place with Billy Thomson. The club challenged for the 1993–94 Scottish Premier Division title, eventually finishing third. He was regarded as a cult hero at Motherwell.

A £250,000 move to English side Queens Park Rangers followed, but he played just 11 times in two years; the manager who signed him, Gerry Francis, soon moved on to Tottenham Hotspur and after a minor injury, Dijkstra found the new manager Ray Wilkins chose other goalkeepers ahead of him. After loan spells at other English clubs, Dijkstra moved back to Scotland with Dundee United for £50,000, reuniting with manager Tommy McLean whom he had worked under at Motherwell. Dijkstra's time in Scotland was successful again, with over 80 appearances for the Terrors, including another third-place finish in the Scottish League in 1996–97 and a Scottish League Cup runners-up medal later  in 1997, after he again took the place of Ally Maxwell in the team.

After a contract dispute, Dijkstra left Tannadice in 1999 and returned to the Netherlands to play for amateur side VV Sittard (via a week's spell with Ipswich Town), although he would end the season with RBC Roosendaal as a replacement for injured Belgian goalkeeper Jurgen Belpaire. Another year with RBC followed before a final playing spell with German Verbandsliga side Germania Teveren.

Coaching career
He was appointed goalkeeping coach at Fortuna Sittard in June 2017.

Personal life
Dijkstra is married and has a daughter. He also has three children with his first wife. He has his own goalkeeping academy in Kerkrade. In a 2020 interview, Dijkstra reflected upon his time playing in Scotland as the happiest in his career.

Honours
Dundee United
 League Cup runner-up: 1997–98

References

External links 
 Official website profile
 

1966 births
Living people
Sportspeople from Kerkrade
Association football goalkeepers
Dutch footballers
Roda JC Kerkrade players
AZ Alkmaar players
Motherwell F.C. players
Queens Park Rangers F.C. players
Bristol City F.C. players
Wycombe Wanderers F.C. players
Dundee United F.C. players
Ipswich Town F.C. players
RBC Roosendaal players
Germania Teveren players
Eredivisie players
Scottish Football League players
Scottish Premier League players
Premier League players
Dutch expatriate footballers
Expatriate footballers in Belgium
Expatriate footballers in Scotland
Expatriate footballers in England
Expatriate footballers in Germany
Dutch expatriate sportspeople in Belgium
Dutch expatriate sportspeople in Scotland
Dutch expatriate sportspeople in England
Dutch expatriate sportspeople in Germany
Footballers from Limburg (Netherlands)